Ben Philippe is a Haitian-Canadian author and screenwriter.

Biography 
Philippe was born in Haiti and raised in Montreal. Philippe received his B.A. from Columbia University in 2011 and received his MFA from the Michener Center for Writers in Austin, Texas. He is currently based in New York City and is an assistant professor at Barnard College.

His debut novel, The Field Guide to the North American Teenager, was named one of ALA Best Fiction for Young Adults in 2020. He won the 2020 William C. Morris Award for his work on the novel.

In 2020, Philippe published a novel, Charming As A Verb, followed by a memoir, Sure, I'll Be Your Black Friend in 2021, which was named one of Canada's best nonfiction books by CBC.

In January 2022, Philippe was nominated for the Writers Guild of America Award for Television: New Series and Writers Guild of America Award for Television: Dramatic Series for his work on Only Murders in the Building.

References

External links 

 

Living people
Writers from Montreal
21st-century Canadian novelists
Columbia College (New York) alumni
Michener Center for Writers alumni
Canadian male screenwriters
Barnard College faculty
21st-century Canadian screenwriters
21st-century Canadian male writers
Canadian male novelists
Black Canadian writers
Haitian emigrants to Canada
Year of birth missing (living people)
The William C. Morris YA Debut Award winners